The Jefferson Dancers is the performance group of advanced students from the magnet arts dance program at Jefferson High School in Portland, Oregon, United States. The company was founded by Mary Vinton Folberg in the early 1980s. Folberg served as artistic director of the dance company from its founding until the mid-1990s.

Currently, Steve Gonzales holds the title of Artistic Director of the company that is now the longest running dance program in Portland, Oregon.

The company performs annually in Portland venues, such as the Newmark Theatre. The company also performs in Portland's Singing Christmas Tree. Past international tours have included performances in England, France, Germany, Italy and Canada, and in 1991 the company performed in Moscow and Leningrad. The group has also performed at Kennedy Center, in Hood River, Oregon, and in numerous schools around the state, often teaching children's dance classes.

In 1992, Folberg went on sabbatical, during which Julane Stites served as artistic director of the company. That year, the company was the subject of the 30-minute Public Broadcasting Service (PBS) program titled A Musical Encounter: The Dance Program . Stites left the program for the Arts & Communication Magnet Academy in Beaverton in 1999.

In 1995, Folberg left the dance department of Jefferson High School to found The Northwest Academy, an alternative arts high school in Portland. Program alumni and MOMIX dancer Steve Gonzales has served as artistic director since 1999.

See also

 List of dance companies in Oregon

References

External links
 The Jefferson Dancers (official website)

Dance companies in the United States
Schools of the performing arts in the United States
Dance in Oregon